Helen Williams (née Helen Wright, born 6 March 1973 in Scotland) is an Australian female curler originally from Scotland.

Biography
She is a farmer's daughter from Scotland, from a curling family. She was runner-up in the Scottish Junior Championships, and then played with Olympic gold medallist Rhona Martin’s team for a while. In 1997, when she was part of the Scottish and Britain national training squad and they were looking ahead to the Olympic Winter Games Nagano 1998, she injured her right ankle and she had a year away from competitive curling. She moved to Australia, to Perth and did not comes back to Scotland.

She is a resident of Nedlands, Western Australia.

Teams and events

Women's

Mixed

References

External links
 

Living people
Australian female curlers
Scottish female curlers
1973 births
Sportspeople from Perth, Western Australia
Scottish emigrants to Australia
Scottish expatriate sportspeople in Australia